Great Boughton is a civil parish in Cheshire West and Chester, England.  It contains seven buildings that are recorded in the National Heritage List for England as designated listed buildings, all of which are at Grade II.   This grade is the lowest of the three gradings given to listed buildings and is applied to "buildings of national importance and special interest".  The parish is mainly residential, forming a suburb to the east of Chester, and two of the listed buildings are houses dating from the 18th century.  Running through the parish is the Shropshire Union Canal (originally the Chester Canal); associated with this are three listed buildings, two locks and a cottage.  The other listed structures are two boundary stones.

See also
Grade I listed buildings in Cheshire West and Chester
Grade II* listed buildings in Cheshire West and Chester
Grade II listed buildings in Chester (east)
Listed buildings in Christleton
Listed buildings in Guilden Sutton
Listed buildings in Huntington

References

Listed buildings in Cheshire West and Chester
Lists of listed buildings in Cheshire